Phrynocephalus mystaceus, also known as the secret toadhead agama and toad-headed agama, is a species of agamid lizard. It is found in southern Russia, Kazakhstan, and northwestern China (Xinjiang) and southward to northern Iran, Afghanistan, Turkmenistan, Tajikistan, Kyrgyzstan, and Uzbekistan.

Subspecies
Two subspecies are recognized:

Habitat

References

mystaceus
Lizards of Asia
Reptiles of Afghanistan
Reptiles of China
Reptiles of Iran
Fauna of Kazakhstan
Fauna of Kyrgyzstan
Reptiles of Russia
Fauna of Tajikistan
Fauna of Turkmenistan
Fauna of Uzbekistan
Taxa named by Peter Simon Pallas
Reptiles described in 1776